Coleophora indefinitella is a moth of the family Coleophoridae. It is found in the United States, including Kentucky.

References

indefinitella
Moths described in 1971
Moths of North America